Tvoje tvář má známý hlas is a Czech reality singing series that is aired on Nova. It is both based on the Endemol format Your Face Sounds Familiar and an adaptation of the Spanish "Tu cara me suena." The show was first broadcast on March 26, 2016, and is still aired. The show involves eight or ten celebrities (singers, actors and television personalities) portraying various iconic singers each week to win 25,000 CZK for their chosen charity.

Format
The show challenges celebrities to perform as different iconic music artists every week, which are chosen by the show's "Randomiser". They are then judged by the panel of celebrity judges.

Each celebrity becomes transformed into a different singer each week, and performs an iconic song and dance routine well known by that particular singer. The 'randomiser' can choose any older or younger artist available in the machine, or even a singer of the opposite sex, or a deceased singer. Celebrity is transformed to look like well know Singer.

The contestants are awarded points from the judges based on their singing and dance routines. After the jury vote, the contestants have to give a set of points to a fellow contestant of their choice. The total score of each contestant is counted by summing the points from judges and contestant's voting. In case of a tie, the judges will choose the weeks winner.

Whoever is at the top of the leaderboard at the end of the each show receives a cash prize for a charity of their choice and a further grand prize for the "series champion".

Voting
The contestants are awarded points from the judges (and each other) based on their singing and dance routines. The points go from 1 to 8, with 8 being the judge's favorite of the night. After that, each contestant gives 5 points to a fellow contestant of their choice (known as "Bonus" points). The judges' score is combined with the "Bonus" points. From the eighth season, the points go from 1 to 10 due to ten contestants. In a special duet week, points were divided into pairs from 6 to 10 and the winners were two contestants.

Cast

Presenter
Ondřej Sokol as presenter on every episode in seasons 1–6. In Season 7, Ondřej Sokol was replaced with Vladimír Polívka. In Season 7, Vladimír Polívka was replaced in the sixth episode, in the eighth episode and in the ninth episode with Ondřej Sokol. In Season 8, Vladimír Polívka was replaced with Ondřej Sokol and Aleš Háma. In season 9, Aleš Háma did not moderate the fourth episode.

Judges
Jakub Kohák, Jitka Čvančarová and Janek Ledecký as judges on every episode, while the fourth judge varies with each episode. In Season 2, Jitka Čvančarová was replaced with Iva Pazderková. In Season 4, Iva Pazderková was replaced with Aleš Háma. In Season 7, Jakub Kohák and Janek Ledecký was replaced with Ondřej Sokol and Eva Burešová. In Season 6, Aleš Háma was replaced in the third episode with Zdeněk Pohlreich. In Season 7, Ondřej Sokol was replaced in the second episode with Ondřej Brzobohatý, in the sixth episode he was replaced with Matěj Ruppert, in the eighth episode he was replaced with Patrik Děrgel, in the ninth episode was replaced with Martin Dejdar. In Season 7, Eva Burešová was replaced in the eighth episode and in the ninth episode with Patricie Pagáčová. In Season 8, Ondřej Sokol was replaced with Jakub Kohák and Aleš Háma was replaced with Marek Lambora. In Season 8 in the eighth episode was Marek Lambora replaced with Janek Ledecký. In Season 9, Marek Lambora was replaced with Daniel Dangl. In Season 9, Eva Burešová was replaced in the ninth episode with Patricie Pagáčová.

Coaches

Drama Coach
Drama Coach teaches contestants how to change into the singer's personality. In Season 1 it was Jiří Vejdělek, famous Czech director. He was replaced with Iva Pazderková (contestant in Season 1 and in the special Season 8). She was the couch in Season 2 and 3. In Season 4 Iva Pazderková was replaced with Martin Dejdar, contestant in Season 3. In Season 5 Martin Dejdar was replaced with Aleš Háma, contestant of Season 3 and a judge from Season 4 to season 7 and also a host in the special Season 8. In Season 6, Aleš Háma was replaced with Patrik Děrgel, actor who starred in Season 5. In Season 7, the winner of Season 2 Jan Cina returned to the role of Drama Coach. In the special Season 8, Jan Cina is replaced by the winner of Season 8, Jitka Čvančarová. In Season 8, in the fourth episode, Jitka Čvančarová was replaced with Aleš Háma and Ondřej Sokol, due to the COVID-19 diagnosis.

Vocal Coach
Linda Finková, Czech singer and teacher of music, is a vocal coach from Season 1. In Season 8, in the fourth and fifth episode Linda Finková was replaced with Bára Basiková due to the COVID-19 diagnosis.

Choreographers
In Seasons 1 to 6 was the main dance company Dance Academy Prague with Yemi A.D. and Angeé. In Season 5 he was for a couple of episodes replaced with a former contestant Roman Vojtek. In Season 7 was Yemi and Angeé Svobodová replaced with Miňo Kereš and Zizoe. Miňo Kereš is also a choreographer for the Slovak version Tvoja Tvár znie povedome. These programs were more connected in 2021. They had the same dance crew and logo.

Series overview

Season 1 (2016)
The first season premiered on March 26, 2016. The contestants were four women and four men:

 Ivana Chýlková, Iva Pazderková, Anna Fialová, Hana Holišová
 Petr Vondráček, David Kraus, Adam Mišík, Petr Rychlý

Season 2 (2016)
The second season premiered on September 4, 2016. The contestants were four women and four men:

 Anna Slováčková, Marta Jandová, Ivana Jirešová, Markéta Procházková
 David Gránský, Jan Cina, Miroslav Etzler, Roman Vojtek

Season 3 (2017)
The third season premiered on February 26, 2017. The contestants were four women and four men:

 Markéta Konvičková, Martha Issová, Adéla Gondíková, Tatiana Vilhelmová
 Aleš Háma, Milan Peroutka, Martin Dejdar, Ondřej Ruml

Season 4 (2017)
The fourth season premiered on September 2, 2017. The contestants were four women and four men:

 Jitka Boho, Berenika Kohoutová, Leona Machálková, Aneta Krejčíková
 Jan Kopečný, Tomáš Matonoha, Dalibor Gondík, Jan Maxián

Season 5 (2018)
The fifth season premiered on September 1, 2018. The contestants were four women and four men:

 Michaela Badinková, Eva Burešová, Jitka Schneiderová, Tereza Mašková
 Robert Jašków, Patrik Děrgel, Jan Révai, Vojtěch Drahokoupil

Season 6 (2019)
The sixth season premiered on September 7, 2019. The contestants were four women and four men:

 Kateřina Marie Fialová, Debbi, Kateřina Brožová, Zuzana Norisová
 Roman Zach, Ján Jackuliak, Marek Lambora, Robert Urban

Season 7 (2020)
The seventh season premiered on September 5, 2020. The contestants were four women and four men:

 Erika Stárková, Bára Basiková, Jitka Čvančarová, Andrea Kalousová
 Albert Černý, Martin Schreiner, Jordan Haj, Bořek Slezáček

Season 8 (2021)
This season is called The Champions and in the season there were contestants from previous seasons.

The eighth season premiered on March 21, 2021. The contestants were five women and five men:

 Marta Jandová, Berenika Kohoutová, Hana Holišová, Jitka Boho, Iva Pazderková
 Petr Rychlý, David Gránský, Albert Černý, Vojtěch Drahokoupil, Roman Vojtek

Season 9 (2022)
The ninth season premiered on February 27, 2022. The contestants were four women and four men:

 Monika Absolonová, Denisa Nesvačilová, Iva Kubelková, Nikita Machytková
 Václav Kopta, Martin Carev, Saša Rašilov, Denis Šafařík

Season 1
This season was announced in the year 2016 and started on March 26, 2016. In this Season, Ondřej Sokol was the moderator. The Judges were Jakub Kohák, Jitka Čvančarová, Janek Ledecký and the special guest. Jiří Vejdělek was the drama coach. Linda Finková was the vocal coach. Yemi A.D. and Angeé Svobodová were the choreographers. The winner of the First Season was Hana Holišová.

Contestants

Performances

Color key:
 indicates the contestant came first that week
 indicates the contestant came last that week
 indicates the contestant did not score
 indicates the contestant was eliminated

Results summary

Guest performances

Invite a Friend

Season overview

Season 2
This season was announced in the year 2016 and started on September 4, 2016. In this Season, Ondřej Sokol was the moderator. The Judges were Jakub Kohák, Iva Pazderková, Janek Ledecký and the special guest. Iva Pazderková was the drama coach. Linda Finková was the vocal coach. Yemi A.D. and Angeé Svobodová were the choreographers. The winner of the Second Season was Jan Cina.

Contestants

Performances

Color key:
 indicates the contestant came first that week
 indicates the contestant came last that week
 indicates the contestant did not score
 indicates the contestant was eliminated

Results summary

Guest performances

Invite a Friend

Season overview

Season 3
This season was announced in the year 2017 and started on February 26, 2017. In this Season, Ondřej Sokol was the moderator. The Judges were Jakub Kohák, Iva Pazderková, Janek Ledecký and the special guest. Iva Pazderková was the drama coach. Linda Finková was the vocal coach. Yemi A.D. and Angeé Svobodová were the choreographers. The winner of the Third Season was Tatiana Vilhelmová.

Contestants

Performances

Color key:
 indicates the contestant came first that week
 indicates the contestant came last that week
 indicates the contestant did not score
 indicates the contestant was eliminated

Results summary

Guest performances

Invite a Friend

Season overview

Season 4
This season was announced in the year 2017 and started on September 2, 2017. In this Season, Ondřej Sokol was the moderator. The Judges were Jakub Kohák, Janek Ledecký, Aleš Háma and the special guest. Martin Dejdar was the drama coach. Linda Finková was the vocal coach. Yemi A.D. and Angeé Svobodová were the choreographers. The winner of the Fourth Season was Berenika Kohoutová.

Contestants

Performances

Color key:
 indicates the contestant came first that week
 indicates the contestant came last that week
 indicates the contestant did not compete in the finals
 indicates the contestant was eliminated

Results summary

Guest performances

Invite a Friend

Season overview

Season 5
This season was announced in the year 2018 and started on September 1, 2018. In this Season, Ondřej Sokol was the moderator. The Judges were Jakub Kohák, Janek Ledecký, Aleš Háma and the special guest. Aleš Háma was the drama coach. Linda Finková was the vocal coach. Yemi A.D., Angeé Svobodová and Roman Vojtek were the choreographers. The winner of the Fifth Season was Michaela Badinková.

Contestants

Performances

Color key:
 indicates the contestant came first that week
 indicates the contestant came last that week
 indicates the contestant did not compete in the finals
 indicates the contestant was eliminated

Results summary

Guest performances

Invite a Friend

Season overview

Season 6 
This season was announced in the year 2019 and started on September 7, 2019. In this Season, Ondřej Sokol was the moderator. The Judges were Jakub Kohák, Janek Ledecký, Aleš Háma and the special guest. Patrik Děrgel was the drama coach. Linda Finková was the vocal coach. Yemi A.D. and Angeé Svobodová were the choreographers. This season was a special tenth Czechoslovak week. The winner of the Sixth Season was Marek Lambora.

Contestants

Performances

Color key:
 indicates the contestant came first that week
 indicates the contestant came last that week
 indicates the contestant did not compete in the finals
 indicates the contestant was eliminated

Results summary

Guest performances

Invite a Friend

Season overview

Season 7 
This season was announced in the year 2020 and started on September 5, 2020. In this Season, Vladimír Polívka was the moderator. The Judges were Ondřej Sokol, Eva Burešová, Aleš Háma and the special guest. Jan Cina was the drama coach. Linda Finková was the vocal coach. Miňo Kereš and Zizoe were the choreographers. This season were special second and eighth Czechoslovak weeks. The winner of the Seventh Season was Jitka Čvančarová.

Contestants

Performances

Color key:
 indicates the contestant came first that week
 indicates the contestant came last that week
 indicates the contestant did not compete in the finals
 indicates the contestant was eliminated

Results summary

Guest performances

Invite a Friend

Season overview

Season 8 
This season is called The Champions. In this season were only the previous contestants. Ten people from all seasons in ten rounds. Season 8 was announced on January 18, 2021, and started on March 21, 2021. In this Season, Ondřej Sokol and Aleš Háma were the moderators. The Judges were Jakub Kohák, Eva Burešová, Marek Lambora and the special guest. Jitka Čvančarová was the drama coach. Linda Finková was the vocal coach. Miňo Kereš and Zizoe were the choreographers. For the first time there were some recreated performances and the Duets round. The winner of the Eighth Season was Hana Holišová, who won the competition for the second time. The winner of the Eighth Season was also David Gránský.

Contestants

Performances

Color key:
 indicates the contestant came first that week
 indicates the contestant came last that week
 indicates the contestant did not compete in the finals
 indicates the contestant was eliminated

Results summary

Guest performances

Invite a Friend

The Masks tournament 
In some episodes, the contestants are recreating some performance from the history of the show. The viewers are voting who done it better on the official Instagram account.

Season overview

Season 9 
This season was announced in December 2021 and started on February 27, 2022. In this Season, Ondřej Sokol and Aleš Háma were the moderators. The Judges were Jakub Kohák, Petra Nesvačilová, Eva Burešová and Daniel Dangl. Adéla Gondíková and Dalibor Gondík were the drama coaches. Linda Finková was the vocal coach. Miňo Kereš was a choreographer. 
This season were special second and seventh Czechoslovak weeks and also a special fourth Movie week. The winner of the Ninth season was Václav Kopta.

Contestants

Performances

Color key:
 indicates the contestant came first that week
 indicates the contestant came last that week
 indicates the contestant did not compete in the finals
 indicates the contestant was eliminated

Results summary

Guest performances

Invite a Friend

Season overview

Viewing figures

Bonus shows

References

External links
 Tvoje tvář má známý hlas

2010s Czech television series
2016 Czech television series debuts
2016 Czech television series endings
Czech reality television series
Singing talent shows
Television series by Endemol
Your Face Sounds Familiar
TV Nova (Czech TV channel) original programming